Three Springs Mine is a talc mine located outside of Three Springs, Western Australia. Owned and operated by the Imerys Group, a French-based company, the mine is the oldest and most productive talc mine in the southern hemisphere, and the second-most productive talc mine in the world, with recent annual production of 240,000 tonnes. Rio Tinto acquired the mine in 2001 from the Western Mining Corporation for US$27.8 million.

References

External links
 MINEDEX website: Three Springs Talc Database of the Department of Mines, Industry Regulation and Safety

Imerys
Talc mines
Surface mines in Australia
Talc mines in Australia
Mines in Western Australia
Shire of Three Springs